CJSI-FM is a christian radio station that broadcasts at 88.9 FM from Calgary, Alberta, Canada. The station uses the on-air brand Shine 88.9 FM, part of the Touch Canada Broadcast Network along with sister stations CJRY-FM in Edmonton and CKRD-FM in Red Deer. CJSI's studios are located on MacLeod Trail South, while its transmitter is located on Old Banff Coach Road in the western part of Calgary.

The station received approval by the CRTC in 1996.

The station plays contemporary Christian music that is "safe and fun for the whole family", featuring artists like Third Day, Mercy Me, Natalie Grant, Toby Mac, Switchfoot and Lifehouse.  Weekend specialty programs include the CT-20, The Sound of Light, 20 The Countdown Magazine, Hope in Anguish and The Heart of Worship.

References

External links
Shine 88.9 FM
 

Jsi
Jsi
Radio stations established in 1996
1996 establishments in Alberta